Bitto is an Italian DOP (Denominazione di Origine Protetta) cheese produced in the Valtelline valley in Lombardy. It owes its name to the Bitto river. Bitto is produced only in the summer months when the cows feed on the high alpine meadows.

The cheese received the DOP (Protected Denomination of Origin) recognition in 1996, with a less restrictive product specification than the traditional one.

Since then, another version of Bitto, called Bitto Storico (Historical Bitto), has been produced by means of traditional methods and promoted by Slow Food (Slow movement). In September 2016 Bitto Storico changed its name to Bitto ribelle.

Production areas
The production area includes province of Sondrio (from the Spluga valley to Livigno, some comuni from the Val Brembana and the Gerola Alta and Albaredo per San Marco vallies.

Production
Bitto Storico is made from whole cow's milk produced in the summer months around the Valtellina valley, to which must be added 10% to 20% goat's milk. Adding a higher percentage of goat's milk allows long aging of 10 years or more. However, due many uncontrollable factors, it is the dairyman's job to determine how long to age each Bitto wheel.

Bitto DOP can be added with goat's milk (it is not mandatory) and can use arbitrary feed for the cows the use enzyme can be used in powder.

References

External links 

Formaggio Bitto Storico Presidio Slow Food 
Consorzio Tutela Valtellina Casera e Bitto 

Cow's-milk cheeses
Italian products with protected designation of origin
Cheeses with designation of origin protected in the European Union
Lombard cheeses